Grey duck may refer to:

 Grey teal, a duck found in New Guinea, Australia, New Zealand, Vanuatu and Solomon Islands
 Pacific black duck, usually called the Grey Duck in New Zealand, a duck found in Indonesia, New Guinea, Australia, New Zealand, and islands in the southwestern Pacific
 Patagonian crested duck, also known as the Southern Crested Duck, or the Grey Duck in the Falkland Islands, the nominate of two subspecies of the Crested Duck

Animal common name disambiguation pages